George is a city in Grant County, Washington, United States. The population was 809 at the 2020 census. The "humorous homage" to President George Washington has landed George, Washington on lists of unusual place names.

The city is known for being near the Gorge Amphitheatre, sometimes called "The Gorge at George". The Gorge Amphitheatre was the location of the annual Sasquatch! Music Festival.

The city also celebrates national holidays such as the Fourth of July, and Washington's Birthday, with cherry pies. The world's largest cherry pie is also baked every year on July 4, and served to a crowd.

History
George began as a large irrigation district between Quincy and Moses Lake. The sole bid was that of a local pharmacist, Charlie Brown, who invested his own money into the venture and solicited planning help from a University of Washington instructor. The plan included streets, utilities, etc.

When filing the papers for the town with the BLM, Brown decided that the town should be named after the first President of the United States, George Washington.

The citizens of the town have named their streets after varieties of cherries grown in the area, such as Bing and Royal Anne.

The town was officially incorporated on July 4, 1957, at a ceremony including Governor Albert Rosellini and a  cherry pie.

Geography

Climate
According to the Köppen Climate Classification system, George has a cold desert climate, abbreviated "BWk" on climate maps.

Demographics

2010 census
At the 2010 census there were 501 people, 131 households, and 109 families living in the city. The racial makeup of the city was 38.1% White, 1.4% Native American, 59.9% from other races, and 0.6% from two or more races. Hispanic or Latino of any race were 75.0%.

Of the 131 households 60.3% had children under the age of 18 living with them, 61.8% were married couples living together, 9.9% had a female householder with no husband present, 11.5% had a male householder with no wife present, and 16.8% were non-families. 8.4% of households were one person and 2.3% were one person aged 65 or older. The average household size was 3.82 and the average family size was 4.14.

The median age was 24.8 years. 35.9% of residents were under the age of 18; 14.9% were between the ages of 18 and 24; 28% were from 25 to 44; 15% were from 45 to 64; and 6.4% were 65 or older. The gender makeup of the city was 54.1% male and 45.9% female.

2000 census
At the 2000 census, there were 528 people, 141 households, and 106 families living in the city. The population density was 879.2 people per square mile (339.8/km). There were 162 housing units at an average density of 269.8 per square mile (104.2/km). The racial makeup of the city was 80.11% White, 0.57% Native American, 0.38% Asian, 16.10% from other races, and 2.84% from two or more races. Hispanic or Latino of any race were 60.23% of the population.

Of the 141 households 49.6% had children under the age of 18 living with them, 58.2% were married couples living together, 6.4% had a female householder with no husband present, and 24.8% were non-families. 18.4% of households were one person and 5.7% were one person aged 65 or older. The average household size was 3.74, and the average family size was 4.39.
The age distribution was 37.7% under the age of 18, 16.5% from 18 to 24, 26.9% from 25 to 44, 14.0% from 45 to 64, and 4.9% 65 or older. The median age was 23 years. For every 100 females, there were 118.2 males. For every 100 females age 18 and over, there were 140.1 males.

The median household income was $21,181 and the median family income was $23,571. Males had a median income of $21,667 versus $13,875 for females. The per capita income for the city was $7,779. About 33.0% of families and 36.2% of the population were below the poverty line, including 46.8% of those under age 18 and 14.0% of those age 65 or over.

References

External links
 City of George

See also
 Cristóbal, Colón

Cities in Washington (state)
Cities in Grant County, Washington
Populated places established in 1957
1957 establishments in Washington (state)